Haunted Towns is an American paranormal television series that premiered on August 15, 2017 in the United States on Destination America. The series features the Tennessee Wraith Chasers, a group of professional paranormal investigators that are known for trying to "trap ghosts" during their investigations. TWC continue on their paranormal journey by traveling to the most haunted locations in the most haunted towns in America. The show initially aired on Tuesdays at 10 p.m. EST. For its second season, it was broadcast on the Travel Channel on Fridays.

Premise
The series features the Tennessee Wraith Chasers, who are back chasing ghosts using their Southern know-how, science, and engineering during their paranormal investigations. This time, they investigate the most haunted locations in the most haunted towns in America, exploring the town's dark history, legend and local lore.

Opening introduction (Season 1): 

Opening introduction (Season 2):

Cast
Tennessee Wraith Chasers:
Chris Smith - "The Architect", TWC Founder
Steven "Doogie" McDougal - "The Complainer", TWC Co-Founder
Scott Porter - "The Profiler", TWC Historian
Brannon Smith - "The Engineer", TWC Inventor
Mike Goncalves - "The Surveillance Guru", TWC Audio Tech

Episodes

Season 1 (2017)

Season 2 (2019)

See also
Apparitional experience
Parapsychology
Ghost hunting

References

External links

Tennessee Wraith Chasers official website

Paranormal reality television series
2010s American documentary television series
2010s American reality television series
2017 American television series debuts
English-language television shows
Destination America original programming